ATP Recordings is a British independent record label that was started in 2001 by London-based concert promoter Barry Hogan of Foundation/All Tomorrow's Parties. It was originally created to bring out a compilation cd (ATPRCD01) after the Tortoise-curated All Tomorrow's Parties event. First, everyone who attended the first festival was given a limited edition promotional sampler (PROATPFCD01), the packaging of which echoed the Factory Records style of Peter Saville. The full compilation followed later, and indeed a number of other ATP festivals would also receive the compilation treatment, the most recent being the 2006 Nightmare Before Christmas, for which ATPR and Plan B Magazine collaborated on a free cd given out to attendees.

The label eventually moved on from just doing compilations for the festival to sign bands like Threnody Ensemble, Bardo Pond, The Magic Band, Jackie-O Motherfucker, Deerhoof and White Out (with Jim O'Rourke). In recent years ATP Recordings has expanded and now also has on its roster Apse, Alexander Tucker, Death Vessel, The Drones, Fuck Buttons, Fursaxa, The Scientists, Sleepy Sun, Built To Spill and Autolux.

Towards the end of 2007 they announced plans to release a new series of double 7" singles called Custom Made, which would feature bands choosing four songs; one something old, one something new, one something borrowed (a cover version) and one something blue (artists were free to interpret this as they feel). The first artists to release singles in this series are The Drones, Alexander Tucker and Deerhoof.

The label also released a very special collector's edition of the classic Spiritualized album Ladies and Gentlemen We Are Floating in Space. The label announced in 2010 that they would now be releasing music from Built To Spill throughout Europe and Autolux worldwide (except Japan & North America). They have also announced the release of the debut solo album from The Drones frontman Gareth Liddiard.

For 2012 new signings include Tall Firs, Tennis and Anywhere (feat members of The Mars Volta, Triclops! and The Minutemen).

Current artists
Tall Firs
Band
The Mars Volta 
Triclops! 
The Minutemen
Threnody Ensemble
Bardo Pond
Grimm Grimm
The Magic Band 
The Scientists
Fuck Buttons
Hebronix
Mueran Humanos
Camila Fuchs
Younghusband
Loop

Release history
(Information sourced from )

References

External links
 Official ATPR website
 ATPR myspace

See also

 Lists of record labels

Record labels established in 1999
British independent record labels
Indie rock record labels
Alternative rock record labels
1999 establishments in the United Kingdom